= Schnabel's Battalion =

Schnabel's Battalion, Missouri Cavalry
- Active: 1864 – May 1865
- Country: Confederate States of America
- Allegiance: Confederate States Army
- Branch: Cavalry
- Type: Cavalry Battalion
- Size: 7 Companies (tracked roster)
- Part of: Trans-Mississippi Department
- Engagements: American Civil War * Ozark Mountain Operations

Commanders
- Current commander: Lieutenant Colonel John A. Schnabel

Schnabel's Battalion, Missouri Cavalry was a cavalry battalion that served in the Confederate States Army during the American Civil War.Operating heavily within the rugged Ozark regions, the unit was known for conducting mountain partisan raids and irregular border operations.

== Organization ==
The battalion was established in 1864 by Lieutenant Colonel John A. Schnabel, eventually expanding its organization to encompass seven distinct companies (Companies A through G). The unit drew its manpower from the southern mountain counties of Missouri, recruiting individuals accustomed to frontier operations.

== History ==
Schnabel's Battalion operated as an independent, decentralized command throughout the Ozark Mountains. The unit specialized in mountain ambushes, cutting federal telegraph wire networks, and raiding Union supply wagon trains traveling between outposts. Because of the rough terrain they operated in, the battalion could quickly strike federal lines and retreat into safety before larger infantry units could respond. The battalion maintained operational cohesion until surrendering to Union authorities at Jacksonport, Arkansas, in May 1865.
